Staveley Road is a road in Chiswick in the London Borough of Hounslow which was the site of the first successful V-2 missile attack against Britain.

History

Staveley Road was built between 1927 and 1931 as part of the Chiswick Park Estate.

September 1944 explosion
On Friday 8 September 1944, a V-2 launched from Wassenaar in Holland, by 485 Artillerie Abteilung at 6.37pm, landed in Staveley Road near the junction with Burlington Lane, killing three people (including a three-year-old girl), and injuring nineteen. The crater was thirty feet across. Earlier that day at 8.39am, a V2 had hit Maisons-Alfort in France, where six people were killed; the V2 had been launched from Petites-Tailles, near Houffalize, in south-east Belgium by Lehr und Versuchsbatterie 444.

Eleven houses were completely destroyed, and another fifteen had to be extensively rebuilt. The area at the time had been partly evacuated. The explosion could be heard six miles away in central London. Within an hour of the explosion, government officials were arriving at the scene.

The explosion has been shown in the 2015 production Hitler's Space Rocket, produced with ZDF of Germany, and in the 1965 film Operation Crossbow.

British knowledge of the V-2
General Wilhelm Ritter von Thoma discretely mentioned to General Ludwig Crüwell about the V-2, when being bugged by MI19, so disclosing the rocket's propensity on 22 March 1943 - this was the first occasion that the British knew. Fritz Lustig was one of translators, father of Radio 4's Robin Lustig.

RV Jones received most of his information on the V2 from the French spy Jeannie Rousseau.

The general public was not notified about the existence of V-2 rockets until 10 November 1944.

References

External links
 Timeline of V2 attacks
 Independent October 1992
 Chiswick Local History Society
 BBC September 2004

1944 in London
1944 in military history
Buildings and structures in the United Kingdom destroyed during World War II
Buildings and structures in the London Borough of Hounslow
Chiswick
Explosions in London
History of the London Borough of Hounslow
Monuments and memorials in London
Streets in the London Borough of Hounslow
V-weapons